Bartolomé Leonardo de Argensola (August 1562February 4, 1631), Spanish poet and historian.

Biography
Bartolomé Leonardo de Argensola was baptized at Barbastro on August 26, 1562. He studied at Huesca, took orders, and was presented to the rectory of Villahermosa in 1588. He was attached to the suite of the count de Lemos, viceroy of Naples, in 1610, and succeeded his brother Lupercio as historiographer of Aragon in 1613. He died at Saragossa on February 4, 1631.

Works
His principal prose works are the Conquista de las Islas Molucas (1609), and a supplement to Zurita's Anales de Aragón, which was published in 1630. His poems (1634), like those of his elder brother, are admirably finished examples of pungent wit. His commentaries on contemporary events, and his Alteraciones populares, dealing with a Saragossa rising in 1591, are lost.

In the second book of the Conquista de las Islas Molucas, under the title 'Grandeza de la Isla de los Papuas', Bartolomé Leonardo de Argensola reports that the Spaniards call white children born to the black people in New Guinea Albiños. This mentioning is considered the first report of the term, older than the use of the term by Balthazar Telles.

An interesting life of this writer by Father Miguel Mir precedes a reprint of the Conquista de las Islas Molucas, issued at Saragossa in 1891.

References

External links
 
 
 

1562 births
1631 deaths
People from Barbastro
Spanish poets
17th-century Spanish historians
Spanish male poets
University of Salamanca alumni
16th-century Spanish Roman Catholic priests